It Is My Music (Swedish: Det ar min musik) is a 1942 Swedish comedy film directed by Börje Larsson and starring Nils Kihlberg, Eva Henning and Sigurd Wallén. It was shot at the Råsunda Studios in Stockholm. The film's sets were designed by the art director Arne Åkermark.

Cast
 Nils Kihlberg as 	Jan-Erik Wallbo
 Eva Henning as 	Inga Bergius
 Sigurd Wallén as 	Lars Bergius
 Irma Christenson as 	Maud Welander
 Ernst Eklund as 	Georg Welander
 Lasse Dahlquist as 	Macce Bergius
 Eric Abrahamsson as 	Anders Wirén
 Carl Ström as 	Prof. Qvist
 Anders Frithiof as 	Prof. Hammarberg
 Rune Halvarsson as 	Sture Gylling
 Jullan Kindahl as 	Mrs. Johansson
 Einar Axelsson as 	Ragnar
 Olav Riégo as 	Secretary
 Ragnar Widestedt as 	Clerk in Concert hall
 Ingemar Holde as 	Jocke
 Gunnar Ekwall as 	Pråmen
 Ann-Margret Bergendahl as 	Guest at party
 Gösta Bodin as 	Oskarsson
 Rolf Botvid as Man in dance saloon
 Gard Cederborg as 	Miss Hallgren
 Ingrid Envall as 	Guest at party	
 Gösta Grip as 	Gentleman
 Gustaf Hedström as Man in audience
 Egil Holmsen as 	Guest at party
 Marianne Lenard as Guest
 Gerd Mårtensson as 	Britta
 Dagmar Olsson as 	Lady in store
 Charley Paterson as 	Caretaker
 Willy Peters as 	Birger, sculptor
 Bellan Roos as 	Waitress
 Erik Rosén as 	Doctor
 Hanny Schedin as 	Miss Lindkvist
 Anna-Lisa Söderblom as 	Guest
 Gustaf Torrestad as 	Young Man
 James Westheimer as 	Man

References

Bibliography 
 Qvist, Per Olov & von Bagh, Peter. Guide to the Cinema of Sweden and Finland. Greenwood Publishing Group, 2000.

External links 
 

1942 films
Swedish comedy films
1942 comedy films
1940s Swedish-language films
Films directed by Börje Larsson
Swedish black-and-white films
1940s Swedish films